Following is a complete list of the approximately 340 dams owned by the United States Bureau of Reclamation as of 2008.

The Bureau was established in July 1902 as the "United States Reclamation Service" and was renamed in 1923.  The agency has operated in the 17 western states of the continental U.S., divided into five administrative regions.  Within the United States Department of the Interior, it oversees water resource management, specifically the oversight and/or operation of numerous diversion, delivery, and storage projects it built throughout the western United States for irrigation, flood control, water supply, and attendant hydroelectric power generation.

Currently USBR is the largest wholesaler of water in the country, bringing water to more than 31 million people, and providing one in five Western farmers with irrigation water for 10 million acres of farmland, which produce 60% of the nation's vegetables and 25% of its fruits and nuts.  USBR is also the second-largest producer of hydroelectric power in the western United States.

All major dams are linked below.

List of active dams 

 Agate Dam, Dry Creek, Oregon
 Agency Valley Dam, North Fork Malheur River, Oregon
 Alcova Dam, North Platte River, Wyoming
 Almena Dam, Prairie Dog Creek, Kansas
 Altus Dam, North Fork Red River, Oklahoma	
 American Diversion Dam, Rio Grande, New Mexico
 American Falls Dam, Snake River, Idaho
 Anderson Ranch Dam, Boise River, Idaho
 Anderson-Rose Diversion Dam, Lost River, Oregon
 Angostura Dam, Cheyenne River, South Dakota
 Angostura Diversion Dam, Rio Grande, New Mexico
 Anita Dam, Yellowstone River, Montana
 Arbuckle Dam, Rock Creek, Oklahoma
 Arrowrock Dam, Boise River, Idaho
 Arthur R. Bowman Dam, Crooked River, Oregon	
 Arthur V. Watkins Dam, Colorado River, Utah
 Avalon Dam, Pecos River, New Mexico
 B. F. Sisk Dam, San Luis Creek, California	
 Barretts Diversion Dam, Beaverhead River, Montana	
 Bartlett Dam, Verde River, Arizona
 Bartley Diversion Dam, Republican River, Nebraska	
 Belle Fourche Dam, Owl Creek, South Dakota
 Belle Fourche Diversion Dam, Owl Creek, South Dakota
 Big Sandy Dam, Big Sandy River, Wyoming
 Black Canyon Diversion Dam, Payette River, Idaho	
 Blue Mesa Dam, Gunnison River, Colorado
 Boca Dam, Little Truckee River, California
 Boise River Diversion Dam, Boise River, Idaho
 Bonny Dam, Republican River, Colorado	
 Box Butte Dam, Niobrara River, Nebraska
 Boysen Dam, Wind River, Wyoming
 Bradbury Dam, Santa Ynez River, California
 Brantley Dam, Pecos River, New Mexico
 Bretch Diversion Dam, Elk Creek, Oklahoma
 Broadhead Diversion Dam, Provo River, Utah
 Buckhorn Dam, Grass Valley Creek, California
 Buffalo Bill Dam, Shoshone River, Wyoming	
 Bull Lake Dam, Bull Lake Creek, Wyoming
 Bully Creek Dam, Bully Creek, Oregon
 Bumping Lake Dam, Bumping River, Washington
 Caballo Dam, Rio Grande, New Mexico
 Cambridge Diversion Dam, Republican River, Nebraska
 Camp Creek Diversion Dam, Camp Creek, California
 Camp Dyer Diversion Dam, Agua Fria River, Arizona
 Canyon Ferry Dam, Missouri River, Montana
 Carpinteria Dam, offstream storage, California
 Carson River Diversion Dam, Carson River, Nevada
 Carter Creek Diversion Dam, Carter Creek, Colorado
 Carter Lake Dam, offstream storage, Colorado
 Cascade Dam, Payette River, Idaho
 Casitas Dam, Coyote Creek, California
 Causey Dam, Ogden River, Utah
 Cedar Bluff Dam, Smoky Hill River, Kansas
 Chapman Diversion Dam, Chapman Gulch, Colorado
 Cheney Dam, Ninnescah River, Kansas	
 Choke Canyon Dam, Frio River, Texas
 Clark Canyon Dam, Beaverhead River, Montana
 Cle Elum Dam, Cle Elum River, Washington
 Clear Creek Dam, Tieton River, Washington
 Clear Lake Dam, Lost River, California
 Cold Springs Dam, offstream storage, Oregon
 Como Dam, Rock Creek, Montana
 Conconully Dam, Salmon Creek, Washington
 Contra Loma Dam, offstream storage, California
 Corbett Diversion Dam, Shoshone River, Wyoming
 Crane Prairie Dam, Deschutes River, Oregon
 Crawford Dam, Iron Creek, Colorado
 Crystal Dam, Gunnison River, Colorado	
 Culbertson Diversion Dam, Frenchman Creek, Nebraska
 Currant Creek Dam, Currant Creek, Utah
 Davis Creek Dam, Davis Creek, Nebraska
 Davis Dam, Colorado River, Arizona and Nevada
 Deadwood Dam, Deadwood River, Idaho
 Deaver Dam, offstream storage, Wyoming
 Deer Creek Dam and Reservoir, Provo River, Utah
 Deer Flat East Dike Dam, offstream storage, Idaho
 Deer Flat Lower Embankment, offstream storage, Idaho
 Deer Flat Middle Embankment, offstream storage, Idaho
 Deer Flat Upper Embankment, offstream storage, Idaho
 Deerfield Dam, Castle Creek, South Dakota	
 Derby Diversion Dam, Truckee River, Nevada
 Dickinson Dam, Heart River, North Dakota
 Dille Diversion Dam, Big Thompson River, Colorado	
 Dixon Canyon Dam, offstream storage, Colorado
 Dodson Diversion Dam, Milk River, Montana	
 Dressler Diversion Dam, Nevada
 Dry Creek Diversion Dam, Dry Creek, Colorado	
 Dry Falls Dam, Grand Coulee, Washington
 Dry Spotted Tail Diversion Dam, Dry Spotted Tail Creek, Nebraska
 Dunlap Diversion Dam, Niobrara River, Nebraska	
 East Canyon Dam, Colorado River, Utah
 East Park Dam, Little Stony Creek, California
 East Portal Diversion Dam, Wind River, Colorado
 Easton Diversion Dam, Yakima River, Washington
 Echo Dam, Weber Basin, Utah
 Eden Dam, Little Sandy Creek, Wyoming
 El Vado Dam, Rio Chama, New Mexico
 Elephant Butte Dam, Rio Grande, New Mexico
 Emigrant Dam, Emigrant Creek, Oregon
 Enders Dam, Frenchman Creek, Nebraska	
 Fish Lake Dam, Little Butte Creek, Oregon
 Flaming Gorge Dam, Green River, Utah
 Flatiron Afterbay Dam, Chimney Hollow Creek, Colorado	
 Folsom Dam, American River, California
 Fontenelle Dam, Green River, Wyoming
 Fort Cobb Dam, Cobb Creek, Oklahoma
 Fort Shaw Diversion Dam and Canal, Sun River, Montana
 Foss Dam, Washita River, Oklahoma
 French Canyon Dam, Cowiche Creek, Washington
 Fresno Dam, Milk River, Montana
 Friant Dam, San Joaquin River, California
 Fruitgrowers Dam, Alfalfa Run, Colorado
 Fryingpan Diversion Dam, Fryingpan River, Colorado
 Funks Dam, Funks Creek, California
 Garnet Diversion Dam, Uncompahgre River, Colorado
 Gerber Dam, Miller Creek, Oregon
 Gibson Dam, Sun River, Montana
 Glen Annie Dam, Glen Annie Canyon, California
 Glen Canyon Dam, Colorado River, Arizona
 Glen Elder Dam, Solomon River, Kansas
 Glendo Dam, North Platte River, Wyoming
 Granby Dam, Colorado River, Colorado
 Grand Coulee Dam, Columbia River, Washington
 Granite Creek Diversion Dam, Colorado	
 Granite Reef Diversion Dam, Salt River, Arizona
 Grassy Lake Dam, Grassy Creek, Wyoming
 Gray Reef Dam, North Platte River, Wyoming
 Green Mountain Dam, Blue River, Colorado
 Guernsey Dam, North Platte River, Wyoming
 Halfmoon Diversion Dam, Halfmoon Creek, Colorado
 Hanover Diversion Dam, Bighorn River, Wyoming
 Haystack Dam, offstream storage, Oregon
 Heart Butte Dam, Heart River, North Dakota	
 Helena Valley Dam, Tenmile Creek, Montana
 Heron Dam, Colorado River, New Mexico	
 Hoover Dam, Colorado River, Nevada and Arizona
 Horse Creek Diversion Dam, Horse Creek, Wyoming
 Horse Mesa Dam, Salt River, Arizona
 Horseshoe Dam, Verde River, Arizona
 Horsetooth Dam, (offstream storage), Colorado
 Howard Prairie Dam, Little Butte Creek, Oregon
 Hubbard Dam, offstream storage, Idaho	
 Hungry Horse Dam, South Fork Flathead River, Montana
 Hunter Creek Diversion Dam, Hunter Creek, Colorado
 Huntington North Dam, Huntington Creek, Utah
 Hyatt Dam, Keene Creek, Oregon
 Hyrum Dam, Little Bear Water, Utah
 Imperial Dam, Colorado River, California and Arizona
 Island Park Dam, Henrys Fork (Snake River), Idaho
 Isleta Diversion Dam, Rio Grande, New Mexico
 Ivanhoe Diversion Dam, Ivanhoe Creek, Colorado
 Jackson Gulch Dam, offstream storage, Colorado	
 Jackson Lake Dam, Snake River, Wyoming
 James Diversion Dam, James River, South Dakota	
 Jamestown Dam, James River, North Dakota
 Joes Valley Dam, Seely Creek, Utah
 John Franchi Diversion Dam, Fresno River, California
 Jordanelle Dam, Provo River, Utah
 Kachess Dam, Kachess River, Washington
 Keechelus Dam, Yakima River, Washington
 Keene Creek Dam, Keene Creek, Oregon
 Kent Diversion Dam, North Loup, Nebraska
 Keswick Dam, Sacramento River, California
 Keyhole Dam, offstream storage, Wyoming
 Kirwin Dam, Solomon River, Kansas
 Kortes Dam, North Platte River, Wyoming
 Laguna Diversion Dam, Colorado River, Arizona and California
 Lahontan Dam, Carson River, Nevada
 Lake Alice No 1 Dam, offstream equalizing reservoir, Nebraska	
 Lake Alice No 1 and 1 Half, offstream equalizing reservoir, Nebraska	
 Lake Alice No 2 Dam, offstream equalizing reservoir, Nebraska
 Lake Sherburne Dam, Swiftcurrent Creek, Montana
 Lake Tahoe Dam, Truckee River, California
 Lauro Dam, Diablo Creek, California
 Lemon Dam, Florida River, Colorado
 Lewiston Dam, Trinity River, California
 Lily Pad Diversion Inlet Dam, Ivanhoe Creek, Colorado	
 Link River Dam, Link River, Oregon	
 Little Hell Creek Diversion Dam, Little Hell Creek, Colorado	
 Little Panoche Detention Dam, Little Panoche Creek, California
 Little Wood Dam, Little Wood River, Idaho
 Los Banos Creek Detention Dam, Los Baños Creek, California
 Lost Creek Dam, Lost Creek, Utah	
 Lost River Diversion Dam, Lost River, Oregon
 Lovewell Dam, White Rock Creek, Kansas	
 Lower Yellowstone Diversion Dam, Yellowstone River, Montana
 Malone Diversion Dam, Lost River, Oregon
 Mann Creek Dam, Mann Creek, Idaho
 Marble Bluff Dam, Little Truckee River, Nevada
 Martinez Dam, offstream storage, California
 Marys Lake Dike Dam, offstream storage, Colorado
 Mason Dam, Powder River, Oregon	
 McGee Creek Dam, McGee Creek, Oklahoma
 McKay Dam, McKay Creek, Oregon
 McPhee Dam, Dolores River, Colorado
 Medicine Creek Dam, Medicine Creek, Nebraska	
 Meeks Cabin Dam, Blacks Fork, Wyoming	
 Merritt Dam, Snake River, Nebraska
 Middle Cunningham Creek Diversion Dam, Cunningham Creek, Colorado	
 Midview Dam, offstream storage, Utah	
 Midway Creek Diversion Dam, Midway Creek, Colorado	
 Milburn Diversion Dam, Middle Loup, Nebraska	
 Miller Diversion Dam, Miller Creek, Oregon
 Minatare Dam, offstream equalizing reservoir, Nebraska
 Minidoka Dam, Snake River, Idaho
 Monticello Dam, Putah Creek, California
 Moon Lake Dam, Lake Fork River, Utah
 Mormon Creek Diversion Dam, Mormon Creek, Colorado	
 Mormon Flat Dam, Salt River, Arizona	
 Mormon Island Auxiliary Dam, Blue Ravine, California	
 Morrow Point Dam, Gunnison River, Colorado
 Mountain Park Dam, West Otter Creek, Oklahoma
 Mt Elbert Forebay Dam, offstream storage, Colorado	
 Nambe Falls Dam, Colorado River, New Mexico	
 Navajo Dam, San Juan River, New Mexico
 Nelson Dam, offstream storage, Montana
 New Melones Dam, Stanislaus River, California
 New Waddell Dam, Agua Fria River, Arizona
 Newton Dam, Colorado River, Utah	
 Nimbus Dam, American River, California
 No Name Creek Diversion Dam, No Name Creek, Colorado	
 Norman Dam, Little River, Oklahoma
 North Cunningham Creek Diversion Dam, Cunningham Creek, Colorado
 North Dam, Grand Coulee, Washington
 North Fork Diversion Dam, North Fork Creek, Colorado
 North Poudre Diversion Dam, Colorado
 Northside Diversion Dam, Stony Creek, California
 Norton Dam, Prairie Dog Creek, Kansas
 O'Neill Dam, San Luis Creek, California
 O'Sullivan Dam, Crab Creek, Washington
 Ochoco Dam, Ochoco Creek, Oregon
 Olympus Dam, Big Thompson River, Colorado
 Ortega Dam, offstream storage, California
 Owyhee Dam, Owyhee River, Oregon
 Pactola Dam, Rapid Creek, South Dakota
 Palisades Dam, Snake River, Idaho
 Palo Verde Diversion Dam, Colorado River, Arizona and California
 Paonia Dam, Muddy Creek, Colorado	
 Paradise Diversion Dam, Milk River, Montana
 Parker Dam, Colorado River, Arizona and California
 Pathfinder Dam, North Platte River, Wyoming
 Pathfinder Dike Dam, North Platte River, Wyoming	
 Pilot Butte Dam, offstream storage, Wyoming
 Pineview Dam, Ogden River, Utah
 Pinto Dam, offstream storage, Washington	
 Pishkun Dikes, offstream storage, Montana
 Platoro Dam, Conejos River, Colorado
 Pole Hill Creek Diversion Dam, Little Hell Creek, Colorado	
 Prosser Creek Dam, Prosser Creek, California	
 Pueblo Dam, Arkansas River, Colorado	
 Putah Dam, Putah Creek, California	
 Rainbow Diversion Dam, Stony Creek, California	
 Ralston Dam, Garland Canal, Wyoming	
 Rattlesnake Dam, Rattlesnake Creek, Colorado	
 Red Bluff Diversion Dam, Sacramento River, California
 Red Fleet Dam, Big Bush Creek, Utah	
 Red Willow Creek Diversion Dam, Red Willow Creek, Nebraska
 Red Willow Dam, Red Willow Creek, Nebraska
 Reservoir A Dam, offstream storage, Idaho	
 Ridgway Dam, Uncompahgre River, Colorado
 Rifle Gap Dam, Rifle Creek, Colorado	
 Ririe Dam, Snake River, Idaho	
 Robles Diversion Dam, seasonal conduit, California	
 Roza Diversion Dam, Yakima River, Washington	
 Ruedi Dam, Fryingpan River, Colorado	
 Rye Patch Dam, Humboldt River, Nevada
 Salmon Lake Dam, offstream storage, Washington	
 San Acacia Diversion Dam, Rio Grande, New Mexico	
 San Justo Dam, offstream storage, California
 Sanford Dam, Canadian River, Texas
 Santanka Dike Dam, offstream storage, Colorado
 Sawyer Diversion Dam, Sawyer Creek, Colorado	
 Scofield Dam, Price River, Utah
 Scoggins Dam, Scoggins Creek, Oregon
 Seminoe Dam, North Platte River, Wyoming
 Senator Wash Dam, offstream storage, California
 Shadehill Dam, Grand River, South Dakota
 Shadow Mountain Dam, Colorado River, Colorado
 Shasta Dam, Sacramento River, California
 Silver Jack Dam, Cimarron Creek, Colorado
 Sly Park Dam, Sly Park Creek, California
 Soldier Canyon Dam, offstream storage, Colorado
 Soldier Creek Dam, Strawberry River, Utah	
 Soldiers Meadow Dam, Webb Creek, Idaho
 South Cunningham Creek Diversion Dam, Cunningham Creek, Colorado
 South Fork Diversion Dam, Colorado	
 South Platte Supply Canal Diversion Dam, Boulder Creek, Colorado	
 Spring Canyon Dam, offstream storage, Colorado	
 Spring Creek Debris Dam, Spring Creek, California
 St. Mary Diversion Dam, St. Mary River, Montana
 Stampede Dam, Little Truckee River, California
 Starvation Dam, Strawberry River, Utah
 Stateline Dam, East Fork of Smiths Fork, Utah
 Steinaker Dam, Ashley Creek, Utah
 Stewart Mountain Dam, Salt River, Arizona
 Stony Gorge Dam, Stony Creek, California
 Sugar Loaf Dam, Arkansas River, Colorado
 Sumner Dam, Pecos River, New Mexico
 Sun River Diversion Dam, Sun River, Montana
 Superior Courtland Diversion Dam, Republican River, Nebraska
 Swift Current Dike, Swiftcurrent Creek, Montana
 Taylor Park Dam, Taylor River, Colorado	
 Terminal Dam, offstream storage, California
 Theodore Roosevelt Dam, Salt River, Arizona
 Thief Valley Dam, Powder River, Oregon
 Three Mile Falls Diversion Dam, Umatilla River, Oregon
 Tiber Dam, Marias River, Montana
 Tieton Dam, Tieton River, Washington
 Trenton Dam, Republican River, Nebraska
 Trinity Dam, Trinity River, California
 Tub Springs Creek Diversion Dam, Tub Springs Creek, Nebraska
 Twin Buttes Dam, Spring Creek, Texas
 Twin Lakes Dam, Lake Creek, Colorado
 Twitchell Dam, Cuyama River, California
 Unity Dam, Burnt River, Oregon
 Upper Slaven Diversion Dam, Humboldt River, Nevada
 Upper Stillwater Dam, Colorado River, Utah	
 Vallecito Dam, Pine River, Colorado
 Vandalia Diversion Dam, Milk River, Montana
 Vega Dam, Plateau Creek, Colorado
 Virginia Smith Dam, Calamus River, Nebraska
 Wanship Dam, Weber River, Utah
 Warm Springs Dam, Malheur River, Oregon
 Wasco Dam, Clear Creek, Oregon
 Webster Dam, Solomon River, Kansas
 Whalen Diversion Dam, North Platte River, Wyoming	
 Whiskeytown Dam, Clear Creek, California
 Wickiup Dam, Deschutes River, Oregon
 Willow Creek Dam, Willow Creek, Colorado	
 Willow Creek Dam, Willow Creek, Montana
 Willwood Diversion Dam, Shoshone River, Wyoming
 Wind River Diversion Dam, Wind River, Wyoming
 Woodston Diversion Dam, Solomon River, Kansas	
 Yellowstone River Diversion Dam, Yellowstone River, Montana
 Yellowtail Afterbay Dam, Bighorn River, Montana
 Yellowtail Dam, Bighorn River, Montana

Others 

 Anchor Dam, South Fork Owl Creek, Wyoming	 (unfillable)
 Teton Dam, Teton River, Idaho (failed)
 Mansfield Dam, Colorado River (Texas), Texas (partially owned)
 Grand Valley Diversion Dam, Colorado River, Colorado (transferred out)

Proposed 

These projects have been abandoned, with the exception of the Temperance Flat Dam.

 Ah Pah Dam 
 Auburn Dam
 Bridge Canyon Dam 
 Echo Park Dam 
 Hooker Dam 
 Marble Canyon Dam 
 Temperance Flat Dam

References

Bureau
United States Bureau of Reclamation